Christer Sjögren sjunger Sinatra is a 2014 Christer Sjögren album of Frank Sinatra songs.

Track listing
For Once in My Life
Strangers in the Night
Fly Me to the Moon
Smile
Summer Wind
The Lady is a Tramp
As Time Goes By
Something
New York, New York
Nancy
I Got You Under My Skin
It Was a Very Good Year
My Way

Charts

References 

2014 albums
Christer Sjögren albums